David Clarke (born 25 January 1970) is an Australian cricketer. He played two first-class matches for South Australia between 1988 and 1990.

See also
 List of South Australian representative cricketers

References

External links
 

1970 births
Living people
Australian cricketers
South Australia cricketers
Cricketers from Adelaide